Quentalia veca is a moth in the family Bombycidae. It was described by Herbert Druce in 1887. It is found in Panama.

References

Bombycidae
Moths described in 1887